Cercle Athletique Dudelange, abbreviated to CAD, is an amateur athletics club in Dudelange, in southern Luxembourg.  Founded in 1932, the club is based at Stade J.F. Kennedy, in the Burange district of northern Dudelange.  Former Dudelange athletes include Roland Bombardella and René Kilburg.

Team Records 

 Correct as of August 2017 Season

Men

Women 

*exception: updated as of August, 2018

References

External links 

 CA Dudelange official website

Dudelange
Sports teams in Dudelange
Sports clubs established in 1932
1932 establishments in Luxembourg